Northland Nightmares is a flat track roller derby league based in Whangarei, New Zealand.

Teams 
Northland Nightmares founded their first team, Hell's Wives, in 2010.  Hell's wives competed in Auckland competition until the league grew popular enough to hold its own internal competitions.

In 2011 intra-league teams Death Row Dolls and Diva Destruction were formed.  Hell's Wives continues as the league's traveling representative team.  The junior Derby Bratz team was also formed in 2011.

Venues 
The league originally trained at church-owned Kamo Recreation Centre.  The church moved the league on from there at the beginning of 2011, citing increasing student numbers at the church school, which used the hall as a gym, and falling outside use.  The league then struggled to find a suitable place to train. 

The league's 2011 season was eventually spent training at Portland Hall and bouting at Kensington Stadium.

Notable Achievements 
In 2011 two members of the Northland Nightmares, Jo "Axl-Slash-R" McQueen and Cara "Solid Sarge" Norman were selected to play for Roller Derby Team New Zealand in the inaugural Roller Derby World Cup.  The New Zealand team placed 8th out of 13 teams.

References

External links 
 northlandnightmaresrollergirlz.co.nz
 rollerderby.co.nz 

Roller derby leagues established in 2010
Roller derby leagues in New Zealand
Sport in Whangārei
2010 establishments in New Zealand